Plocia is a genus of beetle in the family Cerambycidae.

Species
 Plocia diverseguttata (Heller, 1924)
 Plocia mixta Newman, 1842
 Plocia notata Newman, 1842
 Plocia splendens (Hüdepohl, 1995)

References

Apomecynini
Cerambycidae genera